Papaipema leucostigma, the columbine borer, is a species of moth described by Thaddeus William Harris in 1841 and found in eastern North America. It is listed as endangered in the US state of Connecticut. The larvae feed on Aquilegia, common referred to as columbine.

References

External links
Original description in 

Moths of North America
leucostigma
Moths described in 1841